Harris Newman is a mastering engineer working out of Grey Market Mastering in Montreal, Quebec, Canada. His studio shares a building with the Hotel2Tango recording studio, as well as Constellation Records. Newman has mastered hundreds of albums since 1998, for artists including Wolf Parade, Frog Eyes, A Silver Mt. Zion, Vic Chesnutt, Astral Swans, Carla Bozulich, BBQ, Les Sexareenos, Ravens & Chimes, Molasses, Think About Life, We Are Wolves,  aKido, and Oiseaux-Tempête.

He is also a guitarist and bass player, and has recorded with Montreal groups Sackville, Hrsta, Triple Burner, Esmerine, Angela Desveaux, as well as his own acoustic guitar project, which has seen multiple release on Strange Attractors Audio House. His acoustic guitar style has been compared to John Fahey's output.

Discography
 Ignatz & Harris Newman Bring You Buzzard Meat (2009)
 Decorated (2008)
 Harris Newman / Mauro Antonio Pawlowski split 12 inch (2008)
 Dark Was The Night (2006)
 Triple Burner (2006)
 Accidents With Nature And Each Other (2005)
 Non-Sequiturs (2003)

References

Sources
Artist website
Mastering studio website
Hrsta
Sackville
Triple Burner
[ Allmusic entry]
NPR All Songs Considered audio archive
VPRO VPRO Zeldzaam Dwars session
Maisonneuve magazine article
Montreal Mirror interview

Canadian audio engineers
Canadian folk musicians
Musicians from Montreal
Living people
Year of birth missing (living people)